Walkerjet is a Czech aircraft manufacturer based in Tatiná and founded by Victor Procházka. The company specializes in the design and manufacture of paramotors in the form of ready-to-fly aircraft for the US FAR 103 Ultralight Vehicles rules and the European microlight category.

The company was founded in 1998 by Procházka after he had been involved in ultralight aviation since the late 1980s. The company was initially located in Třemošná, but in 2005 the company moved into a new building in Tatiná, a small village located close to Plzeň.

By the mid-2000s the company offered a wide range of paramotors, including the Swedish Radne Raket 120-powered Walkerjet Spider, the German Solo 210-powered Super Hawk and the Simon series all powered by the Italian Simonini Mini 2 Plus engine. The company also once built a dedicated flight training paramotor, the Walkerjet Schoolboy with a reinforced chassis. The company later designed its own Fly engine series and its more recent paramotor designs, the Walkerjet XC 100 evo and the XC 200 evo, use these in place of the earlier powerplants from other manufacturers.

Aircraft

References

External links

Aircraft manufacturers of the Czech Republic and Czechoslovakia
Ultralight aircraft
Paramotors